Thomasau Roberto Forbes (born 12 October 1988) is a Namibian rugby union player for the  in the Currie Cup and the Rugby Challenge. His regular position is flanker.

Rugby career

Forbes was born in Swakopmund (then in South-West Africa, but part of modern-day Namibia).

References

External links
 

1988 births
Living people
Namibia international rugby union players
Namibian rugby union players
Rugby union flankers
Rugby union players from Swakopmund
Welwitschias players